Muftah Anaqrat was a general for the forces of former Libyan leader Muammar Gaddafi, during the 2011 Libyan civil war, before their defeat and Gaddafi's death in Sirte. Anaqrat was killed in the First Battle of Zawiya in March 2011 as loyalists retook the city. It was claimed that a colonel, Mohamed Gayth was killed alongside him.

References

2011 deaths
Libyan generals
Libyan military personnel killed in action
People killed in the First Libyan Civil War
Year of birth missing